is a Japanese musician and actor. He is the leader and main guitarist of Tokio, a Johnny & Associates musical group.

Career

As an artist 
Prior to debuting with Tokio, Joshima was a backup-dancer for various Johnny's Entertainment boy bands at the time. He also formed temporary music units during that time, such as the Joshima Band with other to-be Tokio members. In 1990 he became the leader and guitarist of Tokio, but it wasn't until 1994 that the band debuted.

As an actor
Joshima has had parts in various dramas since 1989.  One of his first roles ever was as a supporting cast member in the show Gomendou Kakemasu, where he acted alongside Kazuya Takahashi of Otokogumi and Naoto Endou of former Johnny's band Ninja. He has also hosted Ai no Apron and Leader's How-To Book, Brain Power Expedition Quiz! Homunculus with fellow member Taichi Kokubun, and with other Tokio members, hosted Gachinko!, The Tetsuwan Dash, Mentore G, and 5LDK.

Filmography

References

External links
 
 Tokio Official Website on Johnnys-Net

1970 births
Living people
Actors from Chiba Prefecture
Japanese male actors
Japanese rock guitarists
Tokio (band) members
Musicians from Nara Prefecture
20th-century Japanese guitarists
21st-century Japanese guitarists